Quercus sessilifolia is an Asian species of trees in the beech family Fagaceae. It is widespread across Japan, Taiwan, and much of southeastern China (Anhui, Fujian, Guangdong, Guangxi, Guizhou, Hubei, Hunan, Jiangsu, Jiangxi, Sichuan, and Zhejiang provinces). It is placed in subgenus Cerris, section Cyclobalanopsis.

Quercus sessilifolia is a tree up to 25 meters tall. Twigs are waxy. Leaves can be as much as 15 cm long, thick and leathery.

References

External links
line drawing, Flora of China Illustrations vol. 4, fig. 377, drawings 3 + 4 at upper left 

sessilifolia
Trees of China
Trees of Japan
Trees of Taiwan
Plants described in 1851